Sedky is an Egyptian surname.

Notable people with this surname include:
 Atef Sedky (1930–2005), Egyptian politician
 Aziz Sedky (1920–2008), Egyptian politician and engineer
 Ismail Sedky (1875–1950), Egyptian politician 
 Mohamed Sedky Mahmoud (1914–1984), Egyptian military leader
 Reeham Sedky (born 1997), American squash player